Ali Noori Oskouei is a director and producer who serves as Chairman of Eshragh Co.

Life and career
Ali Noori Oskouei  was born in Tehran, Iran. 
As a teenager, Oskouei started his art career as a painter, cartoonist and photographer. After directing some student theaters, he took filmmaking courses in Youth Cinema Association and after two years, he was appointed as a teacher in the same center. Later on, he majored in art research and started teaching directing as well as holding master classes of filmmaking and scriptwriting at Art Center. He has worked as an art consultant to various counsels of Iranian broadcasting organization and a member of the Iranian ASIFA board of directors for five years. Currently Oskouei cooperates with Cinema House as a member of Iranian Guild of Animation. Along with filmmaking and scriptwriting, Oskouei has been on different projects as an art advisor and casting director. He has a broad knowledge and experience in art directing, technical director and VFX supervising. Oskouei has always regarded himself as an independent filmmaker and has been a juror in several national and international festivals and art events. In 2017, his mixed technique antiwar feature animation “Release from Heaven” was premiered during Animation Day in Cannes film festival. The film attracted international attention and won many accredited awards. Describing his film Oskouei said that it’s the suppressed scream of innocent children whose beautiful worlds are brutally destroyed by adults.

Theatrical releases

Awards 
“Animation That Matter” Award, Animation Day in Cannes, Cannes Film Festival, 2017

Best Feature Animation, Accolade Film Festival, US, 2017

Best Feature Animation, Tehran International Animation Festival, 2017

Best Feature Animation, Lisbon International Film Festival, Portugal, 2017

Best Feature Animation, Gold Movie Award Film Festival, London, 2017

Best Feature Animation, Seoul International Animation Festival, Seoul, 2017

Best Feature Animation, Oniros Film Award, Italy, 2017

Best Feature Animation, Isfahan International Film Festival, 2017

Best Feature Animation, Fort Mcmurray International Film Festival, Canada, 2017

Best Feature Animation, Five Continents Film Festival, Venezuela, 2017

Best Feature Animation, Cinema House Awards, Tehran, Iran, 2017

Best Feature Animation, Lake View International Film Festival, India, 2017

Best Feature Animation, Eurasia International Film Festival, Russia, 2017

Best Feature Animation, Animation Studio Festival, California, US, 2017

Best Feature Animation, Around Films International Film Festival, Berlin, Germany, 2017

Best Feature Animation, International Peace Film Festival, US, 2017

Best Avant Gard Film, International Peace Film Festival, US, 2017

Best Cinematography, International Peace Film Festival, US, 2017

Best Film, Pordenone International Film Festival, Italy, 2018

Best Feature Animation, Universal Film Festival, USA, 2018

Best Feature Animation, Asia Rainbow TV Awards, China, 2019

Best Feature Animation Director, Asia Rainbow TV Awards, China, 2019

References

Iranian animators
Iranian animated film directors
1980 births
Living people
People from Tehran
Date of birth missing (living people)